The 2018 Los Angeles Dodgers season was the 129th for the franchise in Major League Baseball, and their 61st season in Los Angeles, California. They played their home games at Dodger Stadium. The Dodgers suffered a season-ending injury to star shortstop Corey Seager early in the season and started the season 16–26, but went 76–45 to close out the season.

They defeated the Colorado Rockies in the 2018 National League West tie-breaker game to claim their sixth straight National League West Championship and became the first team to win six straight division championships since the New York Yankees won nine straight from 1998 to 2006 and only the third overall (the Atlanta Braves won 14 from 1991 to 2005). They opened the playoffs by defeating the Atlanta Braves in four games in the Division Series and defeated the Milwaukee Brewers in seven games in the National League Championship Series. It was the third straight NLCS appearance for the Dodgers, a franchise record and the second consecutive National League pennant. They lost to the Boston Red Sox in the 2018 World Series, their second straight World Series loss. The Dodgers became the first team to lose back-to-back World Series since the Texas Rangers did so in 2010 and 2011, and the first National League team to do so since the Braves in 1991 and 1992.

Offseason

Coaching/Front Office changes
Assistant hitting coach Tim Hyers left the Dodgers to become the hitting coach for the Boston Red Sox while farm director Gabe Kapler left to become manager of the Philadelphia Phillies and his assistant Jeremy Zoll became farm director for the Minnesota Twins. The Dodgers also chose to part ways with long-time bullpen catcher Rob Flippo, who had been in his position since the 2002 season. On November 13, Vice-President of Baseball Operations Alex Anthopoulos left his position to become Executive Vice-President/General manager of the Atlanta Braves. On December 1, the Dodgers announced the hiring of Luis Ortiz and Brant Brown to the dual role of assistant hitting coach/minor league hitting coordinator. They also announced that Brandon Gomes would replace Kapler as Director of Player Development and that Ron Porterfield would take on the new post of Director of Player Health. The Dodgers coaching staff lost two more members in December when bullpen coach Josh Bard left to become bench coach for the New York Yankees and Quality Assurance Coach Juan Castro left to become Director of Operations for the Tijuana Toros. On January 2, they replaced Bard by hiring former MLB pitcher Mark Prior to be the team's bullpen coach.

Roster departures
On November 2, 2017, the day after the 2017 World Series, several Dodgers players became free agents. They were pitchers Yu Darvish, Brandon Morrow and Tony Watson, second baseman Chase Utley and outfielders Curtis Granderson and Franklin Gutiérrez. On November 5, they declined the 2018 option on outfielder Andre Ethier, making him a free agent. Outfielder O'Koyea Dickson was outrighted to the minors and removed from the 40-man roster on November 6. On November 20, the Dodgers designated RHP Josh Ravin for assignment and LHP Grant Dayton was claimed off waivers by the Atlanta Braves.

Trades
On December 16, the Dodgers traded first baseman Adrián González, utility player Charlie Culberson, pitchers Scott Kazmir and Brandon McCarthy, and cash considerations to the Atlanta Braves in exchange for outfielder Matt Kemp. On January 4, the Dodgers made a three-team trade with the Chicago White Sox and Kansas City Royals that sent minor league utility player Jake Peter and pitcher Scott Alexander to the Dodgers, pitchers Joakim Soria and Luis Avilán to the White Sox and pitcher Trevor Oaks and minor league infielder Erick Mejia to the Royals.

Free agent signings
On December 20, the Dodgers signed a one-year contract with free agent pitcher Tom Koehler.

Spring training
Spring training began for the Dodgers on February 13 when pitchers and catchers reported to work at Camelback Ranch in Glendale, Arizona. The primary competition going into camp was in left field where Enrique Hernández, Joc Pederson, Trayce Thompson, Andrew Toles, Alex Verdugo and Matt Kemp were all competing for playing time.

On February 17, the Dodgers announced that they had re-signed second baseman Chase Utley to a two-year, $2 million contract. The Dodgers suffered two serious injuries during spring training, relief pitcher Tom Koehler suffered a strained right shoulder and third baseman Justin Turner suffered a non-displaced fracture of his left wrist after being hit with a pitch. They both would begin the season on the disabled list.

Outfielder Trayce Thompson was designated for assignment on March 27 when it became clear he would not win a spot on the opening day roster. The Dodgers replaced him on the 40-man roster with relief pitcher Cory Mazzoni, who was claimed off waivers from the Chicago Cubs.

Season standings

National League West

National League Wild Card

Record vs. opponents

Regular season

March
The Dodgers began the 2018 season on March 29, 2018, at Dodger Stadium against the San Francisco Giants. Clayton Kershaw, in his team record eighth consecutive Opening Day start, allowed one run (on a solo homer by Joe Panik) in six innings with seven strikeouts but the Dodgers failed to score and lost 1–0. It was the first time the Dodgers had lost on opening day under Kershaw. In the next game, Alex Wood allowed only one hit in eight shutout innings with five strikeouts and no walks. However, the Dodgers offense again struggled, managing only one hit of their own off of Giants starter Johnny Cueto and two relievers. Joe Panik again hit a solo homer, this time off reliever Kenley Jansen in the ninth inning to give the Giants their second straight 1–0 victory. It was only the second time, and first time since the 1968 season that the Dodgers had been shutout in their first two games of the season and the first time they had lost back-to-back 1–0 games since April 24–25, 2000. The Dodgers committed four errors in the game (including three by Logan Forsythe), for the first time since the 2013 season. Kenta Maeda struck out 10 Giants in five innings his debut on March 31 and the Dodgers offense finally pushed across some runs as they picked up their first win of the season, 5–0.

April
The Dodgers finished up the opening series with the Giants on April 1, with a 9–0 victory and a split of the series. Rich Hill struck out five in six scoreless innings while Cody Bellinger hit his first homer of the season and Yasiel Puig had three hits, including a double, and scored two runs.

The first road trip of the season began on April 2 against the Arizona Diamondbacks at Chase Field. Hyun-jin Ryu struggled in his debut, allowing three runs on five hits with five walks in  innings. Yasmani Grandal had three hits, including a homer and Logan Forsythe also homered as the Dodgers took the lead going into the ninth. However, Kenley Jansen allowed a three-run homer to Chris Owings to tie the game and send it into extra innings. The game went into the fifteenth inning, when a Jeff Mathis pinch-hit single drove in the winning run in the Diamondbacks 8–7 win. In the following game, Clayton Kershaw allowed two solo homers in his six innings while striking out six but the bullpen imploded, walking four batters in the seventh as the Diamondbacks went on to win 6–1. The Dodgers were swept in the series when they fell in the final game, 3–0. Patrick Corbin allowed only one hit in  innings and struck out 12. With five loses in their first seven games, this was the Dodgers worst start to a season since 1998. After a rainout on April 6, the Dodgers played the Giants at AT&T Park. The Dodgers lost again, in 14 innings, on a three-run homer by Andrew McCutchen, 7–5. In the next game, they played their third extra inning game of the week, and ended the losing streak thanks to an RBI double by Kyle Farmer in the 10th that gave them a 2–1 win.

Ryu pitched six shutout innings with eight strikeouts on April 9 against the Oakland Athletics back in Los Angeles, while Matt Kemp, Corey Seager and Chris Taylor hit solo homers in a 4–0 win. The Athletics got revenge the next day, recording 21 hits and blowing out the Dodgers 16–6. The Dodgers lost again in the next game, 8–7, to the Diamondbacks. On April 14, the Diamondbacks hit four home runs (including two by A. J. Pollock) to route the Dodgers 9–1. This was the 11th straight regular season loss by the Dodgers to the Diamondbacks, the most against one team since the move to Los Angeles. Clayton Kershaw struck out 12 in seven innings of work the next day as the Dodgers won 7–2, snapping the losing streak.

The Dodgers traveled down the freeway to play the San Diego Padres in a three-game series at Petco Park beginning on April 16. Ryu struck out nine in six innings while Matt Kemp hit a three-run home run and Yasmani Grandal hit a grandslam homer as the Dodgers won 10–3. Alex Wood struck out seven in  innings while allowing only one unearned run in the next game while Kemp homered to give the Dodgers an early lead. However, Kenley Jansen blew his second save of the season sending the game into extra innings.  A two-run double by Grandal opened the scoring and the Dodgers won 7–3 in 12 innings. They completed their first series sweep of the season with a 13–4 win in the series finale. Kenta Maeda struck out 10 in  innings while Corey Seager had four hits and three RBI and Max Muncy homered.

The Dodgers returned home for a three-game series against the Washington Nationals. Max Scherzer out pitched Kershaw in the opener, allowing one run on four hits with nine strikeouts in six innings as the Nationals won 5–2. Ryu allowed only two hits in seven shutout innings the following night and the Dodgers hit three homers to beat the Nationals 4–0. The Dodgers came from behind to win the final game of the series 4–3 thanks to
run scoring doubles by Grandal and Bellinger in the sixth inning. Walker Buehler made his first major league start on April 23 and pitched five scoreless innings against the Miami Marlins. Enrique Hernández was three for four with a home run as the Dodgers won 2–1. Maeda struck out seven in six innings while allowing only one run but the Marlins won 3–2 by scoring twice off Pedro Báez in the top of the ninth. Kershaw struggled in his next start, walking six (tying his career high) and allowing a three-run homer to Miguel Rojas. A comeback attempt by the Dodgers fell short and they lost 8–6.

The Dodgers then went back on the road for a four-game, three day, series against the Giants. In the opener, Ryu struck out seven in  innings while allowing only two runs and also drove in two runs with a double. However, the bullpen faltered and the Dodgers lost 6–4. The Dodgers played a doubleheader with the Giants on April 28 to make up the earlier rainout. In the first game, the Dodgers had a season high in runs (15), hits (20) and extra base hits (9) and Walker Buehler pitched five strong innings. They won the game 15–6. However, in the night game, Austin Jackson's bases loaded double in the fifth inning put the Giants ahead and they won 8–3. Ty Blach allowed only two runs in six innings and the Giants took the series 4–2. Before beginning the next series, a four-game set against the division leading Diamondbacks in Arizona, the Dodgers learned that Corey Seager would require elbow reconstruction surgery and would be lost for the rest of the season. Making a spot start in the first game of the Arizona series, Ross Stripling allowed eight hits and four runs in four innings and the Diamondbacks, led by A. J. Pollock's three home runs and Zack Greinke's 10 strikeouts, pulled away for an 8–5 win.

May
The month of May began with Clayton Kershaw on the mound as the Dodgers were hoping to stop the skid against the Diamondbacks. He held them to two runs on six hits in six innings of work and the Dodgers led thanks to a Cody Bellinger homer. However, the bullpen faltered again and the Dodgers lost their fourth straight, 4–3. Hyun-jin Ryu exited the next game in the second inning, due to a groin strain, but the bullpen performed in this game and Alex Verdugo doubled twice and scored both times in the Dodgers 2–1 win. The Dodgers scored four runs in the eighth inning the next day, partially thanks to two wild pitches and a balk by Jorge de la Rosa, and won 5–2 to salvage a split of the series. The Dodgers next traveled to Monterrey, Mexico for a three-game international series against the San Diego Padres at Estadio de Béisbol Monterrey, starting on May 4. Walker Buehler struck out eight without giving up a hit in six scoreless innings and relievers Tony Cingrani, Yimi García and Adam Liberatore joined on a combined no-hitter, the 12th in major league history and the first by the Dodgers, who won 4–0. A two-run homer buy Raffy Lopez in the following game, allowed the Padres to take the lead in the sixth and they piled on against the Dodgers bullpen to even the series with a 7–4 win. A two-run homer by Eric Hosmer in the fifth inning was the main blow in the Dodgers 3–0 loss to end the road trip.

The Dodgers on April 8 began a six-game homestand, starting with a two-game series with the Diamondbacks. Rich Hill returned from a stint on the disabled list to start the game but he struggled, allowing five runs on seven hits in only four innings. A home run by Kiké Hernández in the ninth tied the game and sent it into extra innings, where the Diamondbacks won in the 12th on a three-run homer by Daniel Descalso. Yasiel Puig had three hits in the next game and the Dodgers won 6–3. The Dodgers next played the Cincinnati Reds in a four-game series. In the opener, Scooter Gennett hit a two-run double off Walker Buehler in the sixth, snapping Buehler's 15 inning scoreless streak and later added a solo homer off a relief pitcher as the Reds won 4–1. Kenta Maeda allowed five runs in only  innings and the Dodgers offense couldn't solve the Reds pitching as they lost again, 6–2. In the next game, Ross Stripling struck out seven in  innings and left the game with the lead, but reliver J. T. Chargois allowed a three-run homer to Scott Schebler and the Dodgers lost again, 5–3. Despite homers by Yasiel Puig and Yasmani Grandal, the Dodgers dropped the next game also, 5–3. It was the Reds first four-game sweep of the Dodgers at Dodger Stadium since 1976. The Dodgers 16–24 record was the team's worst 40 game start since the 1958 season.

The Dodgers went on the road to play the Miami Marlins at Marlins Park. J. T. Realmuto had three hits including a two-out RBI double as the Dodgers lost for the fifth straight game, 4–2. They lost again the next day, 6–5, falling into last place in the division. The Dodgers finally snapped the losing streak the next day, with a 7–0 win. Kenta Maeda struck out eight while only allowing two hits in eight innings while Justin Turner had three hits in four at-bats with two doubles. Thanks to a rainout at Nationals Park on May 18, the Dodgers played a doubleheader against the Washington Nationals on the 19th. In the first game, Ross Stripling allowed only one run in six innings with a career high nine strikeouts and the Dodgers won 4–1. In the second game, Rich Hill started but only threw two pitches before leaving the game due to a blister on his middle finger, forcing the Dodgers bullpen to pitch the entire game. Nationals starter Max Scherzer allowed two runs in seven innings with 13 strikeouts, but the Dodgers rallied against the  bullpen, pulling ahead with a two-run double by Matt Kemp in the ninth off closer Sean Doolittle to win 5–4. This was the first time the Dodgers had won a game where the starting pitcher failed to record an out since May 31, 1981. Kenley Jansen was the first Dodger pitcher to save both games of a doubleheader on the same day since Jeff Shaw on August 25, 2000. The Dodgers completed the sweep of the Nationals with a 7–2 victory. Alex Wood allowed only two runs in six innings and the Dodgers hit three home runs.

The Dodgers returned home on May 21 to play the Colorado Rockies. Walker Buheler struck out six in seven innings while allowing only two hits, one of which was a solo homer by Gerardo Parra. However, the Dodgers got only a solo homer of themselves (by Max Muncy) and the bullpen allowed the go-ahead run in a 2–1 loss. Chris Taylor and Puig hit back-to-back homers in the sixth inning for a 5–3 win the following day. Maeda struck out 12 and only allowed two hits in  scoreless innings as the Dodgers shut out the Rockies 3–0. The Dodgers next began a weekend series with the Padres. Stripling struck out 10 batters in  innings while Kemp had three hits in four at-bats, including a three-run homer as the Dodgers won 4–1. Christian Villanueva hit two home runs as the Padres won 7–5 in the following game. In the last game of the series,  Buehler struck out eight in seven innings while allowing only one run while Max Muncy and Cody Belliger each hit two run homers in the 6–1 win. The Dodgers took on the Philadelphia Phillies on Memorial Day, falling behind 4–0 before they rallied. After failing to get a hit in the first five innings, they scored two in the sixth and three in the eighth to win the game 5–4. Jake Arrieta shut out the Dodgers over seven innings in the following game as the Phillies won 6–1. Ross Stripling dominated in the third game of the series, holding the Phillies to one run on four hits with nine strikeouts in seven innings while Kemp homered and doubled in the 8–2 win. Kershaw returned from a stay on the disabled list to allow one run in five innings but the Dodgers lost, 2–1, when they couldn't get anything going offensively against Phillies ace, Aaron Nola.

June
The Dodgers began June at Coors Field against the Colorado Rockies. In the first game, Yasiel Puig had four hit, including a homer, and Chris Taylor also homered and drove in four runs as the Dodgers won an 11–8 slugfest. In the next game, Joc Pederson hit two home runs and the Dodgers scored eight runs in the seventh inning en route to a 12–4 win over the Rockies. The Dodgers completed the sweep of the Rockies with a 10–7 win. Max Muncy hit two homers for four RBI and Yasmani Grandal also hit a two-run homer. It was their first sweep of the Rockies in Colorado since 2010.

The Dodgers went on the road to play the Pittsburgh Pirates in a three-game series at PNC Park starting on June 5. In the first game, Ross Stripling pitched five scoreless innings with seven strikeouts and the Dodgers hit three home runs en route to a 5–0 shutout win. It was the Dodgers fourth straight game with at least three homers, tying the franchise record set in 1954 and also tied in 2017. In the following game, Matt Kemp had two doubles and a homer for five RBI but the pitching faltered. Caleb Ferguson, making his MLB debut hit two batters, walked three and allowed four runs in only  innings as the Dodgers lost 11–9. The Dodgers had another bullpen game in the finale of the series when rookie Dennis Santana was scratched from his first scheduled MLB start moments before the start of the game, forcing the Dodgers to use a franchise record nine pitchers in the nine inning game. Joc Pederson hit two home runs and Cody Bellinger had three hits, including a homer of his own, as the Dodgers won the game 8–7.

The Dodgers returned home on June 8 to play the Atlanta Braves, starting with a 7–3 win thanks to the team hitting five home runs (two by Yasmani Grandal). The Braves won the next game, 5–3. The Dodgers finished the series with a 7–2 win. Stripling allowed just two runs on two hits in  innings. Next came a brief two-game interleague series against the Texas Rangers starting on June 12. The Dodgers hit three more homers (Muncy, Pederson and Puig) to rout the Rangers 12–5. The Dodgers won the second game, 3–2, in 11 innings when Enrique Hernández scored on wild throw by Rangers reliever Matt Bush. Stripling picked up his sixth straight win in the next outing, on June 15 against the San Francisco Giants. Homers by Kemp and Hernández helped the Dodgers win 3–2. They both homered again the next night as they won again 3–1. The Dodgers five-game winning streak came to an end the next day when Caleb Ferguson allowed two-run home runs to Nick Hundley and Brandon Belt and the Giants won 4–1.

After a rainout on June 18, the Dodgers played a day-night doubleheader against the Chicago Cubs at Wrigley Field on the 19th. In the opener, Kyle Farmer's two-out two-run pinch-hit double in the ninth gave the Dodgers a come-from-behind 4–3 win. However, the Cubs won the next game, 2–1, as Kris Bryant tripled in the 10th inning and scored the winning run on a single by Albert Almora. In the final game of the series, the Dodgers were shut out by the Cubs, 4–0, and lost their first series since mid-May. They next traveled to Citi Field for a three-game weekend series against the New York Mets. A grand slam homer by Cody Bellinger in game one gave the Dodgers a 5–2 win. In the next game, Kemp hit his eighth career grand slam, the Dodgers first pinch-hit slam since Manny Ramirez hit one in 2009, and Max Muncy also homered in the 8–3 win. The Dodgers finished off the sweep of the Mets with an 8–7 victory in 11 innings. They hit seven homers as a team in the game, including two each by Bellinger and Hernández. This was their 12th straight win over the Mets dating back to 2016. They became just the second National League team in history to hit seven solo-homers in a road game (joining the 2006 Atlanta Braves).

The Dodgers returned home to play the Cubs on June 25 and Kenta Maeda struck out nine while allowing only three hits and one walk in seven scoreless innings while solo homers by Hernández and Chris Taylor provided the offense in a 2–1 win. In the following game, Javier Báez had four hits, including a solo homer and a grand slam, to help the Cubs to a 9–4 win. The Dodgers hit three more home runs on the 27th, leading them to a 7–5 win over the Cubs. The next day the Dodgers hit two more home runs, to give them 53 for the month, tying a club record. However, the Cubs scored seven runs off the Dodgers bullpen in the seventh inning to come from behind and win 11–5. Rich Hill struck out 10 in  innings on June 29 against the Colorado Rockies while Justin Turner's ninth inning homer broke the club record with the 54th of the month. However, three solo homers by the Rockies and eight shutout innings from Tyler Anderson led to a 3–1 loss. The Dodgers ended the month with another 3–1 loss to the Rockies as they couldn't solve Germán Márquez, who struck out nine in eight innings.

July
The Dodgers began the month of July with a 6–4 victory over the Rockies. Matt Kemp homered and drove in four runs in the game. Kemp exploded in the next game, with five hits, including a three-run homer, as the Dodgers routed the Pittsburgh Pirates 17–1. The Dodgers hit six more home runs, including two by Max Muncy, in an 8–3 victory in the following game. Yasmani Grandal and Chris Taylor combined for all six RBIs as the Dodgers finished off the sweep of the Pirates with a 6–4 victory on the Fourth of July.

The Dodgers traveled down the 5 Freeway to play the Los Angeles Angels at Anaheim Stadium beginning on July 6. In the opener, two ninth inning errors led to the Angels walking-off with a 3–2 win. Ross Stripling struck out seven with no walks and only three hits in six innings in the Dodgers 3–1 win the next day. A pinch hit homer by Shohei Ohtani gave the Angels a 4–3 win in the last game of the series. Next came a four-game series against the San Diego Padres at Petco Park. Clayton Kershaw allowed only two hits in six scoreless innings as the Dodgers started things off with an 8–2 win. Rookie starter Eric Lauer allowed only four hits while striking out eight in  innings as the Padres evened the series with a 4–1 win on the 10th. Then in the next game, Kenta Maeda struck out nine in  innings, his fourth straight nine strikeout game, as the Dodgers won 4–2. The Dodgers moved into solo possession of first place in the division for the first time all season with a 3–2 win on July 12.

The Dodgers returned home on July 13 for another series with the Angels. Max Muncy hit a solo homer and an RBI single as they won 3–2. However, in the next game, Kole Calhoun hit a homer off Kenley Jansen in the 10th inning to give the Angels a 4–3 win. Clayton Kershaw struck out eight batters in  innings and the Dodgers hit two more home runs as they went into the all-star break with a 5–3 victory over the Angels and a record of 53–43, first place in the NL West.

Matt Kemp was voted by fans to start the 2018 Major League Baseball All-Star Game and Ross Stripling and Kenley Jansen also made the team with Max Muncy as a participant in the Home Run Derby. The day after the game, the Dodgers acquired all-star third baseman Manny Machado from the Baltimore Orioles in exchange for five minor leaguers.

They returned from the break with a three-game series against the Milwaukee Brewers at Miller Park. Machado reached base four times in his debut with the team, with two hits and two walks and Enrique Hernández hit a three-run homer as the Dodgers won 6–4. The Dodgers committed three errors in the next game and lost 4–2. Kemp hit two home runs as the Dodgers ran away with an 11–2 win in the finale of the series. They next traveled to Citizens Bank Park for a series with the Philadelphia Phillies. The Dodgers hit four home runs to take the opener, 7–6. In the second game, Trevor Plouffe hit a three-run home run off Hernandez, who was making his first career pitching appearance, in the 16th inning to give the Phillies a 7–4 win. Yasmani Grandal homered from both sides of the plate earlier in the game. The Phillies took the series with a 7–3 win in the final game. A five-run fifth inning, highlighted by a Carlos Santana triple was the difference. In the opener of their series against the Atlanta Braves at SunTrust Park, Rich Hill struck out eight in seven scoreless innings while Manny Machado hit his first homer as a Dodger in the 8–2 win. On July 27, Clayton Kershaw struck out eight batters in  innings while only allowing one run and also had a two-run single and three walks as a batter as the Dodgers won 4–1. Alex Wood pitched  scoreless innings with only one hit and Yasiel Puig homered and drove in three runs as the Dodgers took the next game, 5–1. In the last game of the roadtrip, the Dodgers were no hit by Braves pitcher Sean Newcomb for  innings before Chris Taylor singled with two out in the ninth. They lost 4–1.

A three-run home run by Eric Thames led the Brewers to a 5–2 victory over the Dodgers at Dodger Stadium on July 30. In the next game, Walker Buehler only allowed one run on five hits in seven innings with seven strikeouts, but that run was all it took in a 1–0 loss to end the month.

August
The Dodgers began the month of August with a 10-inning, 6–4, win over the Brewers. Yasmani Grandal hit two homers, including a walk-off, and Brian Dozier, who was acquired in a trade the previous day, also homered. The Dodgers finished with a split of the four-game series by beating the Brewers 21–5. They hit seven home runs in the game, including two each by Joc Pederson and Yasiel Puig and a grand slam by Cody Bellinger. Nine runs scored in the seventh, a season high, and the 21 runs scored was the most by the Dodgers since July 21, 2001 in Colorado and the most ever at Dodger Stadium. The Houston Astros came to town next, for a rematch of the two teams that played in the 2017 World Series. Justin Verlander struck out 14 batters in  innings while only allowing four hits as the Astros took the opener 2–1. The Astros scored four times in the sixth and seven times in the eighth to route the Dodgers 14–0 in the following game. RBI doubles by Bellinger and Dozier helped the Dodgers salvage the last game of the series, 3–2.

The Dodgers traveled to Oakland Coliseum to play the Oakland Athletics in a quick two game series, which they split. In the first game, Rich Hill allowed two runs in  innings in a 4–2 win. In the second game, Mike Fiers struck out eight of the first 12 batters he faced and the A's held on for a 3–2 win. The Dodgers hit five home runs, including two off Colorado Rockies closer Wade Davis in the ninth inning as they beat the Rockies at Coors Field 8–5 on August 9. A two-run homer by Ryan McMahon in the seventh inning gave the Rockies a 5–4 comeback victory over the Dodgers the following day. McMahon struck again in the next game, hitting a walk-off, three-run, home run to beat the Dodgers 3–2. A bases loaded walk by Dylan Floro in the ninth inning gave the Rockies a 4–3 walk-off win in the series finale.

The Dodgers returned home on August 13 to play the San Francisco Giants. Clayton Kershaw struck out nine while only allowing one run on four hits in eight innings but for the fourth consecutive day the Dodgers bullpen imploded, allowing four runs in the top of the ninth for a 5–2 loss. The Dodgers then lost their fifth straight game, 2–1, with the final run scoring in the ninth inning off the bullpen again. In the next game, Hyun-jin Ryu allowed only three hits while striking out six in six scoreless innings in his first game after spending  months on the disabled list. However, the Dodgers bullpen blew a lead for the seventh straight game. This time  the Dodgers managed to win in 12 innings, 4–3, on a sacrifice fly by Brian Dozier.

The Dodgers began a series with the Seattle Mariners at Safeco Field on August 17. Walker Buehler struck out eight in six innings and Manny Machado hit two home runs as the Dodgers won 11–1. However, they lost the next day, 5–4, in 10 innings when Dylan Floro balked with the bases loaded. The Dodgers hit three solo home runs in the game. Kershaw allowed one run on four hits in seven innings with seven strikeouts as the Dodgers finished off the series with a 12–1 win.

Back home on August 20, Kenley Jansen returned from a stay on the disabled list with an irregular heartbeat to allow two back-to-back home runs in the ninth inning and the Dodgers lost to the St. Louis Cardinals, 5–3. Both Yadier Molina and Marcell Ozuna hit two-run homers as the Cardinals took the next game also, 5–2. In the final game of the series, Walker Buehler allowed only three hits while striking out nine in seven scoreless innings and the Dodgers managed just one hit (a solo home run by Joc Pederson) off of Jack Flaherty, who struck out 10 in six innings. A pinch-hit home run by Tyler O'Neill off Scott Alexander tied the game in the eighth and Paul DeJong hit a two-run homer off Jansen in the ninth to give the Cardinals a 3–1 win and a sweep of the series, their first in Los Angeles since 2006. The Dodgers began Players Weekend with an 11–1 rout of the San Diego Padres. Rich Hill struck out eight in six scoreless innings while they hit three homers among 13 team hits. Kershaw struck out nine in eight innings the following day and the Dodgers led going into the ninth (thanks to a three-run homer by Manny Machado) before Jansen blew another save by allowing a tying home run by Austin Hedges. This time the managed to eventually win thanks to a walk-off RBI double by Justin Turner in the 12th inning. Turner had a career high with five RBI in the next game, as the Dodgers swept the Padres with a 7–3 win.

The Dodgers played a quick two game series against the Texas Rangers at Globe Life Park. Machado drove in four runs and Brian Dozier homered as they won the opener, 8–4. In the second game, Alex Wood pitched seven scoreless innings and the Dodgers hit three home runs and a triple, their only hits of the night, in a 3–1 win.

They returned home on August 30 to begin a four-game series against the division leading Arizona Diamondbacks. A three-run home run by David Peralta in the fifth inning accounted for the Diamondbacks only runs in a 3–1 win over the Dodgers. The following day, Kiké Hernández and Justin Turner hit home runs in the eighth inning to lead the Dodgers to a 3–2 comeback victory.

September
The Dodgers moved into a tie for first place in the division when Matt Kemp hit a three-run home run off Archie Bradley in the eighth inning to give them another 3–2 comeback win. In the last game of the series Walker Buehler tied his career high nine strikeouts while allowing only one earned run. For the second day in a row, Kemp drove in the winning runs, this time with a two-RBI walk-off double to help the Dodgers win their third straight game over the Diamondbacks, 3–2, to take over solo possession of first place in the division. The lead didn't last long as they fell back into second place the next day, this time behind the Colorado Rockies, thanks to a 4–2 loss to the New York Mets, thus snapping the aforementioned streak of 12 straight wins over the Mets above. A three-run, pinch-hit, homer by Brandon Nimmo in the top of the ninth was the difference. After falling behind by four runs in the next game, the Dodgers scored 11 unanswered runs en route to an 11–4 victory. Amed Rosario had three of the Mets 14 hits in the as they won the series with a 7–3 victory.

The Dodgers then began a 10-game road trip, starting with three against the first-place Rockies at Coors Field on September 7. Clayton Kershaw recorded his 12th consecutive quality start, the second longest streak of his career, as the Dodgers won 4–2. The Rockies won 4–2 the next day as Kyle Freeland struck out eight in six innings. Justin Turner had four hits in five at-bats, including a homer and two doubles, as the Dodgers took the series with a 9–6 win.  Scooter Gennett had four hits in five at-bats with three RBI as the Cincinnati Reds beat the Dodgers 10–6 at Great American Ball Park on September 10. Luis Castillo struck out nine, while only allowing one run, in  innings as the Reds took the next game also, 3–1. The Dodgers took the series finale, 8–1, to avoid their first season sweep at the hands of the Reds in the 119-year history of the matchup. Manny Machado had three hits, including a home run, and three RBI in four at-bats as the Dodgers began a four-game series against the St. Louis Cardinals at Busch Stadium with a 9–7 win. In the next game, Buehler allowed only two hits in eight scoreless innings while striking out nine and Yasiel Puig hit two home runs as the Dodgers won 3–0. He followed up that performance by hitting three more homers in the next game, in a 17–4 victory. Coupled with a Rockies loss, the Dodgers reclaimed first place in the West. Adam Wainwright struck out nine in six scoreless innings as the Cardinals salvaged the final game of the series, 5–0, and knocked the Dodgers a half a game behind the Rockies.

The Dodgers returned home on September 17 for a crucial three-game divisional series against the Rockies. In the opener, Hyun-jin Ryu pitched seven scoreless innings while Max Muncy hit a three-run homer and Joc Pederson hit two homers, in an 8–2 win to recapture first place. They won again the next day, 3–2, thanks to a walk-off homer by Chris Taylor in the 10th inning. They finished off a sweep of the Rockies with a 5–2 victory. Yasiel Puig's pinch-hit, three-run, homer in the seventh inning was the big blow. Buehler struck out a career-high 12 batters in six innings and the Dodgers tied a National League record with seven players with 20 or more home runs after Kemp hit one in the second inning. The San Diego Padres came to town for the Dodgers final home series of the regular season, beating them in the opener 5–3. In the next game, a three-run homer by Manny Machado helped the Dodgers to a 7–2 win. Ryu struck out eight in six scoreless innings while Kemp was 3 for 4 with a homer and three RBI as the Dodgers won 14–0 in their final home game of the season.

With a narrow  game lead over the Rockies in the division race, the Dodgers began the final week of the season with a road trip to Chase Field to play the Diamondbacks. They rallied from behind to win the first game 7–4. However, a walk-off homer by Eduardo Escobar in the following game gave the Diamondbacks a 4–3 win, cutting the Dodgers lead in the division to half a game. Three homers by the Diamondbacks knocked the Dodgers out of first place entirely by beating them 7–2 on September 26. They next traveled to AT&T Park to end the regular season with a three-game series with the San Francisco Giants. A two-run homer by Justin Turner was the key in a 3–1 victory to begin the series. A tie-breaking RBI triple by Manny Machado helped the Dodgers to a 10–6 win over the Giants on September 29 as they clinched a spot in the postseason and moved into a tie for first place with the Rockies heading into the final game of the season. In that game, Rich Hill allowed only two hits while striking out seven in seven scoreless innings and the Dodgers routed the Giants 15–0. However, the Rockies also won on this day, forcing the two teams to play a tie-breaker game to decide the NL West championship.

National League West Tie-Breaker Game

The Dodgers faced the Colorado Rockies in a tie-breaker game to determine the National League West champion on October 1. Walker Buehler allowed only one hit in  innings and the Dodgers got two-run home runs from Cody Bellinger in the fourth inning and Max Muncy in the fifth. They won the game 5–2 to clinch their sixth consecutive division championship. They became the first team to win six straight division championships since the New York Yankees won 10 straight from 1998 to 2007 and only the third overall (the Atlanta Braves won 14 from 1991 to 2005). On October 4, they were set to play the Atlanta Braves. The first NLDS game was pitched by Hyun Jin Ryu, leaving Kershaw to pitch game 2. This was the first time in 8 out of 10 games that Kershaw has not been selected to start.

Game log

|- bgcolor="ffbbbb"
| 1 || March 29 || Giants || L 0–1 || Blach (1–0) || Kershaw (0–1) || Strickland (1) || 53,595 || 0–1
|- bgcolor="ffbbbb"
| 2 || March 30 || Giants || L 0–1 || Watson (1–0) || Jansen (0–1) ||  Strickland (2)||53,478  || 0–2
|- bgcolor="ccffcc"
| 3 || March 31 || Giants ||W  5–0 || Maeda (1–0) ||  Holland (0–1)|| — ||45,938  || 1–2
|-

|- bgcolor="ccffcc"
| 4 || April 1 || Giants ||W 9–0 || Hill  (1–0)|| Stratton (0–1) || — ||41,866 || 2–2
|- bgcolor="ffbbbb"
| 5 || April 2 || @ Diamondbacks || L 7–8  || Salas (1–1) ||Font (0–1)  || — || 21,735 || 2–3
|- bgcolor="ffbbbb"
| 6 || April 3 || @ Diamondbacks ||L  1–6 || Godley (1–0) || Kershaw (0–2) || — ||27,574  || 2–4
|- bgcolor="ffbbbb"
| 7 || April 4 || @ Diamondbacks ||L 0–3 || Corbin (2–0) || Wood (0–1) ||Boxberger (2) || 25,754 || 2–5
|- bgcolor="bbbbbb"
| – || April 6 || @ Giants ||colspan=6 | Postponed (rain) Rescheduled for April 28
|- bgcolor="ffbbbb"
| 8 || April 7 || @ Giants || L 5–7  || Goméz (1–0) ||Font (0–2)  || — || 42,308 || 2–6
|- bgcolor="ccffcc"
| 9 || April 8 || @ Giants ||W 2–1  ||Fields (1–0)  ||Johnson (0–1)  ||Jansen (1) || 42,374 || 3–6
|- bgcolor="ccffcc"
| 10 || April 10 || Athletics ||W 4–0 || Ryu (1–0) ||Manaea (1–2)  ||Jansen (2)  || 41,243 || 4–6
|- bgcolor="ffbbbb"
| 11 || April 11 || Athletics || L 6–16 ||Mengden (1–2)||Wood (0–2)  || — || 49,394 || 4–7
|- bgcolor="ffbbbb"
| 12 || April 13 || Diamondbacks || L 7–8 || Greinke (1–1) || Maeda (1–1) || Boxberger (5) ||43,791  || 4–8
|- bgcolor="ffbbbb"
| 13 || April 14 || Diamondbacks ||L  1–9 ||McFarland (1–0) ||Hill (1–1)  || — ||44,306  || 4–9
|- bgcolor="ccffcc"
| 14 || April 15 || Diamondbacks ||W 7–2 || Kershaw (1–2) || Godley (2–1) || — || 47,527 || 5–9
|- bgcolor="ccffcc"
| 15 || April 16 || @ Padres ||W 10–3 || Ryu (2–0)  || Erlin (0–2) || — || 23,082 || 6–9
|- bgcolor="ccffcc"
| 16 || April 17 || @ Padres ||W 7–3 ||Alexander (1–0)  ||  Webb (0–1)|| — || 22,959 || 7–9
|- bgcolor="ccffcc"
| 17 || April 18 || @ Padres ||W 13–4 ||Maeda (2–1)  || Perdomo (1–2) || — || 23,748 || 8–9
|- bgcolor="ffbbbb"
| 18 || April 20 || Nationals || L  2–5  || Scherzer (4–1) || Kershaw (1–3) || Doolittle (4) || 50,211 || 8–10
|- bgcolor="ccffcc"
| 19 || April 21 || Nationals || W 4–0 || Ryu (3–0) || Strasburg (2–2) || — || 50,908 || 9–10
|- bgcolor="ccffcc"
| 20 || April 22 || Nationals || W 4–3 || Fields (2–0) || Gott (0–1) || Jansen (3) || 51,297 || 10–10
|- bgcolor="ccffcc"
| 21 || April 23 || Marlins ||W 2–1 ||Liberatore (1–0)  || Barraclough (0–1)  || Fields (1) ||46,909  || 11–10
|- bgcolor="ffbbbb"
| 22 || April 24 || Marlins || L 2–3 ||Steckenrider (1–0)   ||Báez (0–1)  ||Ziegler (2) ||39,284  || 11–11
|- bgcolor="ffbbbb"
| 23 || April 25 || Marlins ||L  6–8 ||González (1–0)  ||Kershaw (1–4)  || — || 39,004 || 11–12
|- bgcolor="ffbbbb"
| 24 || April 27 || @ Giants || L 4–6 ||Dyson (1–0)  ||Cingrani (0–1)  || Strickland (6) ||41,936  || 11–13
|- bgcolor="ccffcc"
| 25 || April 28 (1)|| @ Giants || W 15–6 ||Buehler (1–0)  ||Stratton (2–2)  || — || 41,809 || 12–13
|- bgcolor="ffbbbb"
| 26 || April 28 (2)|| @ Giants ||L  3–8 || Cueto (3–0) || Wood (0–3) || — || 40,608 || 12–14
|- bgcolor="ffbbbb"
| 27 || April 29 || @ Giants ||L 2–4 ||Blach (2–3) ||Maeda (2–2)  ||Strickland (7) || 42,020 || 12–15
|- bgcolor="ffbbbb"
| 28 || April 30 || @ Diamondbacks ||L 5–8 ||Greinke (3–2)  || Stripling (0–1) || Boxberger (9) ||17,562  || 12–16
|-

|- bgcolor="ffbbbb"
| 29 || May 1 || @ Diamondbacks || L 3–4 ||Bracho (1–0)  ||Liberatore (0–1)  ||  Boxberger (10)||18,940  || 12–17
|- bgcolor="ccffcc"
| 30 || May 2 || @ Diamondbacks ||W 2–1 || Hudson (1–0) ||Godley (4–2)  ||Jansen (4) ||19,531  || 13–17
|- bgcolor="ccffcc"
| 31 || May 3 || @ Diamondbacks ||W 5–2 || Chargois (1–0) || Salas (3–2) || Jansen (5) ||21,407 || 14–17
|- bgcolor="ccffcc"
| 32 || May 4 || @ Padres||W 4–0 ||Buehler (2–0)  || Lucchesi (3–2)|| — ||21,536  || 15–17
|- bgcolor="ffbbbb"
| 33 || May 5 || @ Padres || L 4–7 || Yates (2–0) || Fields (2–1) || Hand (8) ||21,791 || 15–18
|- bgcolor="ffbbbb"
| 34 || May 6 || @ Padres || L 0–3 || Lauer (1–1) ||Cingrani (0–2)  ||  Hand (9)  || 21,789 || 15–19
|- bgcolor="ffbbbb"
| 35 || May 8 || Diamondbacks || L 5–8  ||McFarland (2–1)  || García (0–1) || — ||45,894  || 15–20
|- bgcolor="ccffcc"
| 36 || May 9 || Diamondbacks ||W 6–3 || Báez (1–1) ||Salas (3–3)  || Jansen (6) ||45,600  || 16–20
|- bgcolor="ffbbbb"
| 37 || May 10 || Reds ||L 1–4 ||Mahle (3–4)  || Buehler (2–1) ||Iglesias (5) || 47,383 || 16–21
|- bgcolor="ffbbbb"
| 38 || May 11 || Reds || L 2–6 || Brice (1–2) || Maeda (2–3) || Iglesias (6) || 46,979 || 16–22
|- bgcolor="ffbbbb"
| 39 || May 12 || Reds || L 3–5 || Bailey (1–5) || Chargois (1–1) || Hughes (1) || 49,911 || 16–23
|- bgcolor="ffbbbb"
| 40 || May 13 || Reds || L 3–5 || Castillo (3–4) || Hill (1–2) || Iglesias (7) || 44,787 || 16–24
|- bgcolor="ffbbbb"
| 41 || May 15 || @ Marlins ||L  2–4 ||Wittgren (2–0) || Wood (0–4) || Ziegler (6) ||6,242  || 16–25
|- bgcolor="ffbbbb"
| 42 || May 16 || @ Marlins ||L  5–6 || Steckenrider (2–1) ||Báez (1–2)  ||  Ziegler (7) || 5,721 || 16–26
|- bgcolor="ccffcc"
| 43 || May 17 || @ Marlins ||W  7–0 ||Maeda (3–3)  ||Smith (2–5)  || — || 13,820 || 17–26
|- bgcolor="bbbbbb"
| – || May 18 || @ Nationals ||colspan=6 | Postponed (rain) Rescheduled for May 19
|- bgcolor="ccffcc"
| 44 || May 19 (1)|| @ Nationals ||W 4–1 || Stripling (1–1) ||Roark (2–4)  ||Jansen (7) ||26,740  || 18–26
|- bgcolor="ccffcc"
| 45 || May 19 (2) || @ Nationals ||W 5–4 || Goeddel (3–0) || Doolittle (1–2) || Jansen (8) || 32,378 || 19–26
|- bgcolor="ccffcc"
| 46 || May 20 || @ Nationals || W 7–2 || Wood (1–4) || Strasburg (5–4) || Fields (2) || 40,201 || 20–26
|- bgcolor="ffbbbb"
| 47 || May 21 || Rockies ||L 1–2 || Márquez (3–5)  || Báez (1–3) || Davis (17) ||42,805  || 20–27
|- bgcolor="ccffcc"
| 48 || May 22 || Rockies || W 5–3 ||Chargois (2–1)  || Shaw (1–3) ||Jansen (9)  || 43,719 || 21–27
|- bgcolor="ccffcc"
| 49 || May 23 || Rockies ||W 3–0 ||Maeda (4–3)  ||Freeland (4–5)  || Jansen (10)  || 45,884 || 22–27
|- bgcolor="ccffcc"
| 50 || May 25 || Padres || W 4–1 || Stripling (2–1) || Richard (3–6)  || Jansen (11) || 44,612 || 23–27
|- bgcolor="ffbbbb"
| 51 || May 26 || Padres || L 5–7 ||  Stammen (2–0)||Hudson (1–1)  || Hand (16) || 43,920 || 23–28
|- bgcolor="ccffcc"
| 52 || May 27 || Padres || W 6–1 || Buehler (3–1) || Cimber (2–2) || — ||46,650  || 24–28
|- bgcolor="ccffcc"
| 53 || May 28 || Phillies || W 5–4 ||García (1–1)  || Morgan (0–1) || Jansen (12)  || 39,759 || 25–28
|- bgcolor="ffbbbb"
| 54 || May 29 || Phillies ||L 1–6 || Arrieta (5–2) || Maeda (4–4) || — || 40,044 || 25–29
|- bgcolor="ccffcc"
| 55 || May 30 || Phillies ||W 8–2 || Stripling (3–1) ||Eflin (1–2)  || — ||43,302  || 26–29
|- bgcolor="ffbbbb"
| 56 || May 31 || Phillies || L 1–2 || Nola (7–2) ||Fields (2–2)  ||Domínguez (2) || 40,986 || 26–30
|-

|- bgcolor="ccffcc"
| 57 || June 1 || @ Rockies || W 11–8 || Santana (1–0) || Pounders (0–1) ||  Jansen (13) ||  42,711|| 27–30
|- bgcolor="ccffcc"
| 58 || June 2 || @ Rockies || W 12–4 ||Báez (2–3)  || Shaw (2–4) || — || 47,703 || 28–30
|- bgcolor="ccffcc"
| 59 || June 3 || @ Rockies || W 10–7 || Cingrani (1–2) || Davis (0–1) ||Jansen (14) ||41,851  || 29–30
|- bgcolor="ccffcc"
| 60 || June 5 || @ Pirates || W 5–0 || Stripling (4–1)   ||Musgrove (2–1)  || — || 12,879 || 30–30
|- bgcolor="ffbbbb"
| 61 || June 6 || @ Pirates || L 9–11 ||Brault (5–1)  || Hudson (1–2) || Vázquez (11) || 14,327 || 30–31
|- bgcolor="ccffcc"
| 62 || June 7 || @ Pirates ||W  8–7 || Báez (3–3) ||Taillon (3–5) || Jansen (15) || 19,713 || 31–31
|- bgcolor="ccffcc"
| 63 || June 8 || Braves ||W 7–3 ||  Buehler (4–1)  ||McCarthy (5–3)  || — || 47,262 || 32–31
|- bgcolor="ffbbbb"
| 64 || June 9 || Braves ||L  3–5 || Sánchez (2–0) || Wood (1–5) || Vizcaíno (11) || 52,718 || 32–32
|- bgcolor="ccffcc"
| 65 || June 10 || Braves ||W 7–2 || Stripling (5–1) || Newcomb (7–2) || — || 47,711 || 33–32
|- bgcolor="ccffcc"
| 66 || June 12 || Rangers || W 12–5 || Paredes (1–0) || Colón (3–4) || Corcino (1) || 48,233 || 34–32
|- bgcolor="ccffcc"
| 67 || June 13 || Rangers ||W  3–2  || Liberatore (2–1) || Chavez (2–1) || — || 41,303 || 35–32
|- bgcolor="ccffcc"
| 68 || June 15 || Giants ||W 3–2 || Stripling (6–1)  ||Holland (4–7)  ||  Jansen (16)||53,433  || 36–32
|- bgcolor="ccffcc"
| 69 || June 16 || Giants || W 3–1 || Wood (2–5) ||Bumgarner (0–2)  ||  Jansen (17) ||53,706  || 37–32
|- bgcolor="ffbbbb"
| 70 || June 17 || Giants ||L 1–4 || Stratton (8–4) || Ferguson (0–1) || Strickland (14) ||49,541 || 37–33
|- bgcolor="bbbbbb"
| –  || June 18 || @ Cubs ||colspan=6 | Postponed (rain & power outage) Rescheduled for June 19
|- bgcolor="ccffcc"
| 71 || June 19 (1) || @ Cubs ||W 4–3 || Paredes (2–0) || Wilson (1–2) ||  Jansen (18)  ||39,273  || 38–33
|- bgcolor="ffbbbb"
| 72 || June 19 (2) || @ Cubs ||L 1–2  || Zastryzny (1–0) ||Stewart (0–1)  || — || 40,409 || 38–34
|- bgcolor="ffbbbb"
| 73 || June 20 || @ Cubs ||L 0–4 || Lester (9–2) || Stripling (6–2) || — ||41,199  || 38–35
|- bgcolor="ccffcc"
| 74 || June 22 || @ Mets ||W 5–2 || Wood (3–5) || Wheeler (2–6) ||Jansen (19)  || 32,565 || 39–35
|- bgcolor="ccffcc"
| 75 || June 23 || @ Mets ||W 8–3 || Ferguson (1–1) || deGrom (5–3) || — || 37,705 || 40–35
|- bgcolor="ccffcc"
| 76 || June 24 || @ Mets || W 8–7  || Hudson (2–2) || Flexen (0–1) || — || 34,060 || 41–35
|- bgcolor="ccffcc"
| 77 || June 25 || Cubs ||W 2–1 ||Maeda (5–4)  || Underwood Jr. (0–1) || Jansen (20)  ||41,750  || 42–35
|- bgcolor="ffbbbb"
| 78 || June 26 || Cubs ||L 4–9 ||Lester (10–2)  || García (1–2) || — || 53,904 || 42–36
|- bgcolor="ccffcc"
| 79 || June 27 || Cubs || W 7–5 ||Wood (4–5)  ||Hendricks (5–8)  ||Jansen (21)  ||42,121  || 43–36
|- bgcolor="ffbbbb"
| 80 || June 28 || Cubs ||L  5–11 || Cishek (2–0) ||Buehler (4–2)  || — || 52,187 || 43–37
|- bgcolor="ffbbbb"
| 81 || June 29 || Rockies ||L  1–3  || Anderson (5–3) || Hill (1–3) || Davis (23) || 41,909 || 43–38
|- bgcolor="ffbbbb"
| 82 || June 30 || Rockies ||L 1–3 ||Márquez (6–8) ||Maeda (5–5)  || Ottavino (2) || 46,172 || 43–39
|-

|- bgcolor="ccffcc"
| 83 || July 1 || Rockies || W 6–4 ||Hudson (3–2)  || Ottavino (4–2) || Jansen (22) ||45,725  || 44–39
|- bgcolor="ccffcc"
| 84 || July 2 || Pirates ||W 17–1 || Wood (5–5) ||Kingham (2–4)  || Ferguson (1) ||45,207  || 45–39
|- bgcolor="ccffcc"
| 85 || July 3 || Pirates || W 8–3 || Kershaw (2–4) || Nova (4–6) || — || 48,819 || 46–39
|- bgcolor="ccffcc"
| 86 || July 4 || Pirates || W 6–4 || Hill (2–3)||Holmes (0–1)  || Jansen (23) ||  53,139|| 47–39
|- bgcolor="ffbbbb"
| 87 || July 6 || @ Angels ||L 2–3 ||Parker (2–1) || Jansen (0–2) || — || 44,323 || 47–40
|- bgcolor="ccffcc"
| 88 || July 7 || @ Angels || W 3–1 || Stripling (7–2) || Cole (0–1) || Jansen (24) ||  44,409|| 48–40
|- bgcolor="ffbbbb"
| 89 || July 8 || @ Angels ||L 3–4 || Heaney (5–6) || Chargois (2–2) ||Anderson (4) ||42,213 || 48–41
|- bgcolor="ccffcc"
| 90 || July 9 || @ Padres ||W 8–2 || Kershaw (3–4)||Perdomo (1–3)  || — ||28,110  || 49–41
|- bgcolor="ffbbbb"
| 91 || July 10 || @ Padres ||L 1–4 || Lauer (5–5) || Hill (2–4)|| — || 26,272 || 49–42
|- bgcolor="ccffcc"
| 92 || July 11 || @ Padres || W 4–2 ||Maeda (6–5) || Lucchesi (4–5) || Jansen (25) ||26,448  || 50–42
|- bgcolor="ccffcc"
| 93 || July 12 || @ Padres || W 3–2 ||Stripling (8–2)  || Ross (5–8) || Jansen (26) || 29,595 || 51–42
|- bgcolor="ccffcc"
| 94 || July 13 || Angels || W 3–2 || Ferguson (2–1) || Bedrosian (3–2) || Alexander (1) ||53,368  || 52–42
|- bgcolor="ffbbbb"
| 95 || July 14 || Angels || L 4–5  || Álvarez (4–3) ||Jansen (0–3)  || — ||53,797 || 52–43
|- bgcolor="ccffcc"
| 96 || July 15 || Angels ||W 5–3 || Maeda (7–5) ||Cole (0–2)  || Jansen (27) || 47,871 || 53–43
|- bgcolor=#bbb
| – || July 17 || 89th All-Star Game || colspan=6 | National League vs. American League (Nationals Park, Washington, D.C.)
|- bgcolor="ccffcc"
| 97 || July 20 || @ Brewers ||W 6–4 || Hill (3–4) ||Williams (0–3)  || Jansen (28) || 36,812 || 54–43
|- bgcolor="ffbbbb"
| 98 || July 21 || @ Brewers || L 2–4 || Burnes (1–0) || Kershaw (3–5) || Knebel (12) ||36,242  || 54–44
|- bgcolor="ccffcc"
| 99 || July 22 || @ Brewers ||W 11–2 || Wood (6–5) ||Suter (8–7)|| Ferguson (2)|| 38,249 || 55–44
|- bgcolor="ccffcc"
| 100 || July 23 || @ Phillies ||W 7–6 || Alexander (2–0) || Domínguez (1–3)|| Jansen (29)|| 33,753 || 56–44
|- bgcolor="ffbbbb"
| 101 || July 24 || @ Phillies ||L 4–7  ||Velasquez (7–8)  ||Hernández (0–1)  || — || 35,028 || 56–45
|- bgcolor="ffbbbb"
| 102 || July 25 || @ Phillies ||L  3–7 || Arrieta (8–6) || Buehler (4–3) ||Domínguez (10) ||35,659  || 56–46
|- bgcolor="ccffcc"
| 103 || July 26 || @ Braves ||W 8–2 || Hill (4–4)  ||Sánchez (5–3)  || — ||40,706  || 57–46
|- bgcolor="ccffcc"
| 104 || July 27 || @ Braves ||W 4–1 || Kershaw (4–5) ||Foltynewicz (7–7)  ||  Jansen (30) || 41,647 || 58–46
|- bgcolor="ccffcc"
| 105 || July 28 || @ Braves ||W 5–1 ||Wood (7–5)  ||Fried (1–4)  || — || 41,758 || 59–46
|- bgcolor="ffbbbb"
| 106 || July 29 || @ Braves || L 1–4 || Newcomb (10–5) || Stripling (8–3) || — || 40,303 || 59–47
|- bgcolor="ffbbbb"
| 107 || July 30 || Brewers || L 2–5 ||Hader (4–0)  ||Maeda (7–6)  || — || 44,933 || 59–48
|- bgcolor="ffbbbb"
| 108 || July 31 || Brewers ||L 0–1 ||Miley (2–1)  ||Buehler (4–4) || Jeffress (4) ||  44,818|| 59–49
|-

|- bgcolor="ccffcc"
| 109 || August 1 || Brewers || W 6–4  || Floro (4–2)|| Albers (3–3) || — || 41,686 || 60–49
|- bgcolor="ccffcc"
| 110 || August 2 || Brewers ||W  21–5 ||Kershaw (5–5)  ||Chacín (10–4)  || — || 45,087 || 61–49
|- bgcolor="ffbbbb"
| 111 || August 3 || Astros ||L  1–2 || Verlander (11–6) ||Wood (7–6)    || Rondón (11) || 53,598 || 61–50
|- bgcolor="ffbbbb"
| 112 || August 4 || Astros || L 0–14 || Peacock (2–4) || Maeda (7–7) || — || 53,119 || 61–51
|- bgcolor="ccffcc"
| 113 || August 5 || Astros ||W 3–2 || Buehler (5–4) || Cole (10–4) ||  Jansen (31) ||50,628  || 62–51
|- bgcolor="ccffcc"
| 114 || August 7 || @ Athletics ||W 4–2 || Hill (5–4) ||Manaea (10–8) || Jansen (32) || 33,654 || 63–51
|- bgcolor="ffbbbb"
| 115 || August 8 || @ Athletics ||L  2–3 || Familia (7–4) ||Chargois (2–3)  || Treinen (29) || 32,062 || 63–52
|- bgcolor="ccffcc"
| 116 || August 9 || @ Rockies ||W 8–5 || Ferguson (3–1) ||Davis (1–6)  || Alexander (2) || 43,076 || 64–52
|- bgcolor="ffbbbb"
| 117 || August 10 || @ Rockies || L 4–5 || McGee (2–4) || Rosscup (0–1) || Ottavino (5) || 42,184 || 64–53
|- bgcolor="ffbbbb"
| 118 || August 11 || @ Rockies || L 2–3 ||Shaw (4–5)  || Chargois (2–4) || — ||47,633  || 64–54
|- bgcolor="ffbbbb"
| 119 || August 12 || @ Rockies ||L 3–4 ||Davis (2–6)  ||Floro (4–3)  || — || 40,599 || 64–55
|- bgcolor="ffbbbb"
| 120 || August 13 || Giants ||L 2–5 ||Black (2–1)  ||Alexander (2–1)  || Smith (9) || 45,229 || 64–56
|- bgcolor="ffbbbb"
| 121 || August 14 || Giants ||L 1–2 ||Dyson (3–2)  ||Maeda (7–8)  || Smith (10) || 46,734 || 64–57
|- bgcolor="ccffcc"
| 122 || August 15 || Giants || W 4–3 ||Báez (4–3)  ||Kelly (0–1)  || — || 44,987 || 65–57
|- bgcolor="ccffcc"
| 123 || August 17 || @ Mariners || W 11–1 || Buehler (6–4) || LeBlanc (7–3) || — || 46,796 || 66–57
|- bgcolor="ffbbbb"
| 124 || August 18 || @ Mariners ||L 4–5 ) ||Warren (2–1)  ||  Ferguson (3–2)|| — ||43,264  || 66–58
|- bgcolor="ccffcc"
| 125 || August 19 || @ Mariners ||W 12–1 || Kershaw (6–5) || Elías (2–1) || — ||45,419  || 67–58
|- bgcolor="ffbbbb"
| 126 || August 20 || Cardinals ||L 3–5 || Cecil (1–1) || Jansen (0–4) || Norris (25) ||42,402  || 67–59
|- bgcolor="ffbbbb"
| 127 || August 21 || Cardinals ||L 2–5 ||Weaver (7–11)  || Ryu (3–1) ||  Norris (26)  || 43,923 || 67–60
|- bgcolor="ffbbbb"
| 128 || August 22 || Cardinals ||L 1–3 || Hudson (4–0) ||  Jansen (0–5) ||Hicks (5) || 48,247 || 67–61
|- bgcolor="ccffcc"
| 129 || August 24 || Padres ||W 11–1 || Hill (6–4) || Richard (7–11) || — || 47,559 || 68–61
|- bgcolor="ccffcc"
| 130 || August 25 || Padres ||W 5–4  ||Ferguson (4–2)  || Stock (0–1) || — || 53,528 || 69–61
|- bgcolor="ccffcc"
| 131 || August 26 || Padres || W 7–3 || Ryu (4–1) || Erlin (3–4) || — ||43,252  || 70–61
|- bgcolor="ccffcc"
| 132 || August 28 || @ Rangers || W 8–4 || Ferguson (5–2) || Jurado (2–4)  || — || 30,123 || 71–61
|- bgcolor="ccffcc"
| 133 || August 29 || @ Rangers ||W 3–1 || Wood (8–6)   ||Minor (10–7)  || Maeda (1) ||29,181  || 72–61
|- bgcolor="ffbbbb"
| 134 || August 30 || Diamondbacks ||L 1–3 || Ray (4–2) || Hill (6–5) ||Boxberger (31) || 45,150|| 72–62
|- bgcolor="ccffcc"
| 135 || August 31 || Diamondbacks || W 3–2 || Floro (5–3) || Greinke (13–9) || Jansen (33) || 48,965 || 73–62
|-

|- bgcolor="ccffcc"
| 136 || September 1 || Diamondbacks || W 3–2 || Maeda (8–8) || Bradley (4–5) || Jansen (34) || 52,394|| 74–62
|- bgcolor="ccffcc"
| 137 || September 2 || Diamondbacks ||W 3–2 ||  Jansen (1–5) ||Boxberger (2–5)  || — || 48,517 || 75–62
|- bgcolor="ffbbbb"
| 138 || September 3 || Mets || L 2–4 ||Smith (1–0)  ||  Maeda (8–9) || Gsellman (10) || 45,206 || 75–63
|- bgcolor="ccffcc"
| 139 || September 4 || Mets ||W 11–4 || Hill (7–5) || Vargas (5–9)  || — || 46,651 || 76–63
|- bgcolor="ffbbbb"
| 140 || September 5 || Mets ||L 3–7 || Wheeler (10–7) ||  Ryu (4–2) || — || 40,317 || 76–64
|- bgcolor="ccffcc"
| 141 || September 7 || @ Rockies ||W 4–2 || Kershaw (7–5) || Rusin (2–3) || Maeda (2) ||41,547  || 77–64
|- bgcolor="ffbbbb"
| 142 || September 8 || @ Rockies || L 2–4 || Freeland (14–7) || Buehler (6–5) || Davis (39) || 47,867 || 77–65
|- bgcolor="ccffcc"
| 143 || September 9 || @ Rockies || W 9–6 ||Hill (8–5)  || Anderson (6–8) || Alexander (3) ||  40,157|| 78–65
|- bgcolor="ffbbbb"
| 144 || September 10 || @ Reds ||L 6–10 || Hughes (4–3) || Wood (8–7)   || — ||12,161  || 78–66
|- bgcolor="ffbbbb"
| 145 || September 11 || @ Reds ||L 1–3 || Castillo (9–12) || Ryu (4–3) || Iglesias (25) ||14,964  || 78–67
|- bgcolor="ccffcc"
| 146 || September 12 || @ Reds || W 8–1 ||Ferguson (6–2)  ||DeSclafani (7–5)  || — || 15,633 || 79–67
|- bgcolor="ccffcc"
| 147 || September 13 || @ Cardinals || W 9–7 || Kershaw (8–5) || Gomber (5–1) || — ||40,997  || 80–67
|- bgcolor="ccffcc"
| 148 || September 14 || @ Cardinals || W 3–0 || Buehler (7–5) || Flaherty (8–7) ||Jansen (35) || 46,036 || 81–67
|- bgcolor="ccffcc"
| 149 || September 15 || @ Cardinals || W 17–4  || Hill (9–5)   || Gant (7–6)  || — || 45,481 || 82–67
|- bgcolor="ffbbbb"
| 150 || September 16 || @ Cardinals ||L 0–5 || Wainwright (2–3) || Stripling (8–4) || — ||45,217  || 82–68
|- bgcolor="ccffcc"
| 151 || September 17 || Rockies || W 8–2 ||Ryu (5–3)  || Gray (11–8) || — || 45,970 || 83–68
|- bgcolor="ccffcc"
| 152 || September 18 || Rockies || W 3–2  || Floro (6–3) || Ottavino (6–4) || — || 49,537 || 84–68
|- bgcolor="ccffcc"
| 153 || September 19 || Rockies || W 5–2 || Ferguson (7–2) || Oberg (7–1) || Jansen (36) || 50,141 || 85–68
|- bgcolor="ffbbbb"
| 154 || September 21 || Padres || L 3–5 || Lauer (6–7) || Stripling (8–5) || Yates (10) || 52,458 || 85–69
|- bgcolor="ccffcc"
| 155 || September 22 || Padres ||W 7–2 ||Hill (10–5)  ||Nix (2–4)  ||  Jansen (37) || 53,536 || 86–69
|- bgcolor="ccffcc"
| 156 || September 23 || Padres ||W 14–0 || Ryu (6–3) || Lucchesi (8–9) || — || 50,250 || 87–69
|- bgcolor="ccffcc"
| 157 || September 24 || @ Diamondbacks || W 7–4 || Kershaw (9–5) || Chafin (1–6) || — || 26,067 || 88–69
|- bgcolor="ffbbbb"
| 158 || September 25 || @ Diamondbacks || L 3–4 || Boxberger (3–7) || Maeda (8–10) || — || 25,774 || 88–70
|- bgcolor="ffbbbb"
| 159 || September 26 || @ Diamondbacks || L 2–7 || Greinke (15–11) || Stripling (8–6) || — || 31,149 || 88–71
|- bgcolor="ccffcc"
| 160 || September 28 || @ Giants || W 3–1 || Ryu (7–3) || Bumgarner (6–7) || Jansen (38) || 41,167 || 89–71
|- bgcolor="ccffcc"
| 161 || September 29 || @ Giants || W 10–6 ||  Wood (9–7)  || Melancon (1–4) || — || 41,768 || 90–71
|- bgcolor="ccffcc"
| 162 || September 30 || @ Giants ||W 15–0 || Hill (11–5) || Suárez (7–13) || — || 41,280 || 91–71
|-

|- bgcolor= "ccffcc"
| 163 || October 1|| Rockies ||W 5–2  || Buehler (8–5)  ||Márquez (14–11) || — || 47,816 || 92–71 
|-

|-
| Legend:       = Win       = Loss       = PostponementBold = Dodgers team member

Postseason

National League Division Series

The Dodgers, as the second seed in the National League, opened the playoffs with home field advantage in the 2018 National League Division Series against the third seeded Atlanta Braves.

In the first game, Hyun-jin Ryu got the start in a surprise decision over Clayton Kershaw, who had started the Dodgers six previous playoff openers. He pitched well, with seven shutout innings, striking out eight while allowing only four hits and no walks. Joc Pederson hit a leadoff homer, Max Muncy added a three-run shot the next inning and the Dodgers cruised to a 6–0 victory.

Kershaw started the second game, and pitched eight scoreless innings, while allowing only two hits. Manny Machado hit a two-run home run in the first inning and Yasmani Grandal added a solo homer in the fifth inning to account for the only scoring in the Dodgers 3–0 win. They were only the second team in history to shutout their opponent in the first two playoff games, joining the 1921 New York Yankees.

Walker Buehler started game three for the Dodgers at SunTrust Park, while Sean Newcomb started for the Braves. Atlanta took a 5–0 lead in the bottom of the second inning. The first run came when Sean Newcomb forced a run with a bases-loaded walk, the first time in postseason history a pitcher has done this. Four more runs were scored on a grand slam by Ronald Acuña Jr. Los Angeles got back two runs in the top of the third, on an RBI single by Justin Turner with the second run scoring on error by Acuña.  A two-run homer by Chris Taylor and a solo homer by Muncy tied the game in the fifth inning. After the second inning, Buehler settled down and pitched five innings with only two hits and seven strikeouts. He also walked two and allowed the five runs. The Braves recaptured the lead when Freddie Freeman homered off Alex Wood in the sixth inning. The Dodgers got a couple of baserunners on in the ninth but Arodys Vizcaíno managed to close out the win for the Braves, 6–5, forcing the series to a fourth game.

In the fourth game, Rich Hill started and pitched  innings, allowing two runs on four hits and five walks. Machado drove in four runs, on a double and a three-run home run and David Freese drove in two with a pinch-hit single as the Dodgers won 6–2 to clinch the series and advance to the National League Championship Series for the third straight year, a franchise record.

National League Championship Series

Clayton Kershaw started the first game for the Dodgers at Miller Park and turned in the shortest start of his post-season career, allowing five runs on six hits and two walks in 3+ innings and Yasmani Grandal became the first catcher in post-season history to have two walks and two passed balls in the same game. The Dodgers fell behind 6–1 before a late inning rally against the Brewers bullpen cut the final score to 6–5.

In the second game, Hyun-jin Ryu pitched four scoreless innings but couldn't make it out of the fifth. He wound up going  innings while allowing two runs on six hits. The Brewers took a 3–0 lead after six but the Dodgers got two back in the seventh and then pulled ahead on a two-run homer by Justin Turner in the eighth to win 4–3 and even the series up after two games.

The series moved to Dodger Stadium for game three and Walker Buehler pitched seven innings, with four runs on five hits and eight strikeouts... but the Dodgers were unable to score any runs against Jhoulys Chacín and the Brewers bullpen and lost 4–0. It was the first time the Dodgers had been shut out in a postseason game at home since the 1983 National League Championship Series against the Philadelphia Phillies.

Rich Hill started game four and only allowed one run on three hits and three walks with six strikeouts in five innings. However, the Dodgers, after a first-inning run, were unable to score in regulation and the game went into extra-innings tied at one. In the 13th inning, Manny Machado singled, advanced to second on a wild pitch, and scored the winning run on a single to right by Cody Bellinger to give the Dodgers a 2–1 win.

In the fifth game, Kershaw pitched seven innings, allowing one run on three hits and two walks while striking out nine. He also walked twice as a batter, becoming just the third pitcher in the last 20 years to do so in a postseason game (Jon Lester in the 2016 NLCS and Derek Lowe in the 2008 NLDS). The Dodgers scored five runs on nine hits to win the game 5–2 and take a three games to two series lead.

The series returned to Miller Park for game 6 and Ryu struggled in his second start, allowing five runs on seven hits in three innings as the Dodgers lost 7–2. However, in game 7, Buehler pitched a strong game, striking out seven and only allowing one run in  innings. Cody Bellinger hit a two-run homer and Yasiel Puig hit a three-run homer and the Dodgers won 5–1 to clinch their second straight National League championship, the first time they had done that since 1977 and 1978.

World Series

The Dodgers faced the Boston Red Sox, who had the best record in baseball in 2018, in the World Series. The series began at Fenway Park as the Red Sox had secured homefield advantage. Kershaw became the first pitcher to start the first game of the World Series in back-to-back years since Cliff Lee did so in 2009 (for the Phillies) and 2010 (for the Rangers) and the first to do so for the same team since Dave Stewart pitched three consecutive Game 1s for the Oakland Athletics from 1988 to 1990. His results were not good, allowing five runs on seven hits and three walks with five strikeouts in 4+ innings. The Dodgers kept it close most of the game thanks to a  Matt Kemp homer and three RBI by Manny Machado but the Red Sox pulled away when Eduardo Núñez hit a three-run pinch-hit homer off Alex Wood in the eighth to win the game, 8–4.

Hyun-jin Ryu kept things close in game two and the Dodgers led 2–1 through four innings before Ryu loaded the bases in the fifth and reliever Ryan Madson walked in the tying run and then gave up a single that scored two more, and the Dodgers lost 4–2.

The series moved to Dodger Stadium for Game 3. Walker Buehler pitched seven shutout innings, allowing only two hits without walking anyone and striking out seven while throwing a career-high 108 pitches. The Dodgers took an early lead on Joc Pederson' solo homer in the third inning and that lead held up until two outs in the eighth when Jackie Bradley Jr. homered off of Kenley Jansen to tie the game. Both sides added a run in the 13th inning thanks to sloppy fielding and the game continued into the 18th inning when Max Muncy hit a walk-off homer off Nathan Eovaldi, who was in his seventh inning of relief. At 18 innings and 7 hours and 20 minutes this game became the longest World Series game by both innings and time, surpassing (in playing time) Game 3 of the 2005 World Series, which lasted 14 innings and 5 hours and 41 minutes, and breaking the record (in innings) first set by the Red Sox and Dodgers in the 1916 World Series.

In Game 4, the game was scoreless for the first five innings until the Dodgers jumped out to a 4–0 lead thanks to a throwing error and a three-run homer by Yasiel Puig. Rich Hill was dominant, only allowing one hit in  innings while striking out seven. However, he walked one batter in the seventh and that batter scored when Madson appeared in relief and allowed a three-run homer to Mitch Moreland. With that Madson set a new World Series record by allowing all seven runners he inherited in the series to score. The following inning, Steve Pearce tied the game by hitting a solo homer off Jansen, the second blown save in as many nights for Jansen. Then in the ninth, Brock Holt doubled off Dylan Floro and scored on a single by Rafael Devers to put the Red Sox ahead. They proceeded to blow the game open when Pearce hit a three-run double off Kenta Maeda. Kiké Hernández hit a two-run homer off Craig Kimbrel in the ninth, but it was not enough and the Dodgers lost, 9–6. This was the first time they had lost all season when they had a lead of four runs or more. The Red Sox took a commanding three games to one lead in the series.

For the fifth game, Kershaw returned to the mound, only to be greeted by a two-run homer by Steve Pearce in the first inning. He would allow two  more solo homers in the sixth and seventh innings. Those accounted for the four runs he allowed, on seven hits with five strikeouts. The Red Sox won the game, 5–1 and clinched the series in five games.

Postseason game log

|- bgcolor="ccffcc"
| 1 || October 4 || Braves ||W 6–0 ||Ryu (1–0) ||Foltynewicz (0–1)|| — ||50,947||1–0
|- bgcolor= "ccffcc"
| 2 || October 5 || Braves ||W 3–0 || Kershaw (1–0)||Sánchez (0–1)|| Jansen (1) ||54,452||2–0
|- bgcolor= "ffbbbb"
| 3 || October 7 || @ Braves ||L 5–6 || Toussaint (1–0)||Wood (0–1)|| Vizcaíno (1) ||42,385||2–1
|- bgcolor= "ccffcc"
| 4 || October 8 || @ Braves ||W 6–2 || Madson (1–0) ||Venters (0–1)|| — ||39,586||3–1
|-

|- bgcolor= "ffbbbb"
| 1 || October 12 || @ Brewers ||L 5–6 ||Hader (1–0) ||Kershaw (0–1)|| Knebel (1) ||43,615||0–1
|- bgcolor=  "ccffcc"
| 2 || October 13 || @ Brewers ||W 4–3 || Báez (1–0)||Jeffress (0–1)|| Jansen (1) ||43,905||1–1
|- bgcolor=  "ffbbbb"
| 3 || October 15 || Brewers ||L 0–4 ||Chacín (1–0) ||Buehler (0–1)|| — ||52,793||1–2
|- bgcolor=  "ccffcc"
| 4 || October 16 || Brewers ||W 2–1 || Urías (1–0) || Guerra (0–1) || — ||53,764||2–2
|- bgcolor= "ccffcc"
| 5 ||October 17  || Brewers ||W 5–2 ||Kershaw (1–1) ||Woodruff (0–1)|| Jansen (2) ||54,502||3–2
|- bgcolor=  "ffbbbb"
| 6   ||October 19 ||@ Brewers ||L 2–7 || Knebel (1–0)||Ryu (0–1) || — ||43,619||3–3
|- bgcolor= "ccffcc"
| 7   ||October 20 ||@ Brewers ||W 5–1 || Madson (1–0)|| Chacín (0–1)|| — || 44,097 ||4–3
|-

|- bgcolor=    "ffbbbb"
| 1 || October 23 || @ Red Sox ||L 4–8 ||Barnes (1–0) ||Kershaw (0–1)|| — ||38,454|| 0–1
|- bgcolor=    "ffbbbb"
| 2 || October 24 || @ Red Sox   ||L 2–4 ||Price (1–0) ||Ryu (0–1)|| Kimbrel (1) ||38,644|| 0–2
|- bgcolor=    "ccffcc"
| 3 || October 26 || Red Sox   ||W 3–2  || Wood (1–0)||Eovaldi (0–1)|| — ||53,114|| 1–2
|- bgcolor=  "ffbbbb"
| 4 || October 27 || Red Sox   ||L 6–9 ||Kelly (1–0) ||Floro (0–1)|| — ||54,400|| 1–3
|- bgcolor= "ffbbbb"
| 5 ||October 28   || Red Sox  ||L 1–5 || Price (2–0)||Kershaw (0–2)|| — ||54,367|| 1–4
|-

|-
| 
|- 

|-
| 
|-

|- 
| 
|-

Roster

Statistics

Batting
List does not include pitchers. Stats in bold are the team leaders..

Note: G = Games played; AB = At bats; R = Runs; H = Hits; 2B = Doubles; 3B = Triples; HR = Home runs; RBI = Runs batted in; BB = Walks; SO = Strikeouts; SB = Stolen bases; Avg. = Batting average; OBP = On-base percentage; SLG = Slugging; OPS = On Base + Slugging

Pitching

Stats in bold are the team leaders.

Note: W = Wins; L = Losses; ERA = Earned run average; G = Games pitched; GS = Games started; SV = Saves; IP = Innings pitched; R = Runs allowed; ER = Earned runs allowed; BB = Walks allowed; K = Strikeouts

Awards and honors

Transactions

March
On March 29, placed 3B Justin Turner (broken wrist), RHP Tom Koehler (right anterior capsule strain) and RHP Yimi García (recovering from Tommy John surgery) on the 10-day disabled list. RHP Cory Mazzoni claimed off waivers by the Chicago Cubs.

April
On April 1, acquired IF Breyvic Valera from the St. Louis Cardinals in exchange for minor league OF Johan Mieses and optioned him to AAA Oklahoma City.
On April 2, acquired RHP Jesús Liranzo from the Baltimore Orioles in exchange for minor league LHP Luis Ysla and optioned him to Double-A Tulsa. Transferred RHP Tom Koehler from the 10-day disabled list to the 60-day disabled list.
On April 3, placed RHP Josh Fields on the paternity list, designated RHP Jesús Liranzo for assignment and purchased the contract of RHP Zach Neal from AAA Oklahoma City.
On April 5, claimed RHP Alec Asher off waivers from the Baltimore Orioles and designated RHP Zach Neal for assignment. Asher was assigned to Triple-A Oklahoma City.
On April 7, activated RHP Josh Fields off the paternity list.

On April 12, outrighted RHP Dylan Baker to AA Tulsa.
On April 15, placed IF Logan Forsythe on the 10-day disabled list with right shoulder inflammation and recalled IF Breyvic Valera from AAA Oklahoma City.
On April 17, RHP Alec Asher was claimed off waivers by the Milwaukee Brewers. Acquired RHP Ariel Hernández from the Cincinnati Reds in exchange for minor leaguers Zach Neal and Ibandel Isabel and optioned him to AA Tulsa. Optioned IF Breyvic Valera to AAA Oklahoma City and purchased the contract of IF Max Muncy from AAA Oklahoma City.
On April 18, placed LHP Rich Hill on the 10-day disabled list with a cracked nail on his left middle finger and recalled LHP Adam Liberatore from AAA Oklahoma City.
On April 23, recalled RHP Walker Buehler from AAA Oklahoma City and designated RHP Wilmer Font for assignment.
On April 24, optioned RHP Walker Buehler to Class-A Rancho Cucamonga and purchased the contract of RHP Daniel Hudson from AAA Oklahoma City.
On April 25, activated RHP Yimi García from the 10-day disabled list and optioned him to AAA Oklahoma City.
On April 28, recalled RHP Walker Buehler from Class-A Rancho Cucamonga. Recalled OF Alex Verdugo from AAA Oklahoma City and optioned LHP Scott Alexander to AAA Oklahoma City.
On April 29, optioned RHP Walker Buehler to Class-A Rancho Cucamonga, placed OF Yasiel Puig on the 10-day disabled list with a left hip contusion and recalled RHP Brock Stewart from AAA Oklahoma City.
On April 30, placed SS Corey Seager on the 10-day disabled list with a sprain of the ulnar collateral ligament in his right elbow and recalled IF  Breyvic Valera from AAA Oklahoma City.

May
On May 1, optioned RHP Brock Stewart to AAA Oklahoma City and recalled LHP Edward Paredes from AAA Oklahoma City.
On May 3, placed LHP Hyun-jin Ryu on the 10-day disabled list with a left groin strain, optioned IF Breyvic Valera to AAA Oklahoma City and recalled RHP Yimi García and IF/OF Tim Locastro from AAA Oklahoma City.
On May 4, optioned LHP Edward Paredes to AAA Oklahoma City and recalled RHP Walker Buehler from High-A Rancho Cucamonga and IF Breyvic Valera from AAA Oklahoma City.
On May 6, placed LHP Clayton Kershaw on the 10-day disabled list with left biceps tendonitis and recalled RHP Brock Stewart from AAA Oklahoma City.
On May 7, optioned IF Breyvic Valera to AAA Oklahoma City.

On May 8, activated LHP Rich Hill from the 10-day disabled list and optioned RHP Brock Stewart to AAA Oklahoma City.
On May 9, activated OF Yasiel Puig from the 10-day disabled list, placed LHP Tony Cingrani on the 10-day disabled list with left shoulder inflammation, recalled RHP Brock Stewart and LHP Scott Alexander from AAA Oklahoma City and optioned RHP Yimi García and OF Alex Verdugo to AAA Oklahoma City.
On May 12, optioned RHP Brock Stewart to AAA Oklahoma City, transferred SS Corey Seager from the 10-day disabled list to the 60-day disabled list and purchased the contract of Switch-pitcher Pat Venditte from AAA Oklahoma City.
On May 15, activated IF Logan Forsythe and 3B Justin Turner from the 10-day disabled list and optioned C/3B Kyle Farmer and IF/OF Tim Locastro to AAA Oklahoma City.

On May 18, claimed RHP Erik Goeddel off waivers from the Seattle Mariners and designated LHP Henry Owens for assignment.

On May 19, activated LHP Tony Cingrani from the 10-day disabled list and optioned LHP Adam Liberatore to AAA Oklahoma City. Recalled RHP Yimi García from AAA Oklahoma City, activated RHP Erik Goeddel and optioned Switch-Pitcher Pat Venditte to AAA Oklahoma City.
On May 20, optioned RHP Yimi García to AAA Oklahoma City, recalled Switch-Pitcher Pat Venditte from AAA Oklahoma City and placed LHP Rich Hill on the 10-day disabled list with a blister on the middle finger of his left hand.
On May 23, recalled LHP Edward Paredes from AAA Oklahoma City and optioned RHP J. T. Chargois to AAA Oklahoma City.
On May 28, optioned LHP Edward Paredes to AAA Oklahoma City and recalled RHP Yimi García from AAA Oklahoma City.
On May 29, optioned RHP Brock Stewart to AAA Oklahoma City and recalled IF Breyvic Valera from AAA Oklahoma City.
On May 30, placed RHP Kenta Maeda on the 10-day disabled list with a strained right hip and recalled RHP Dennis Santana from AAA Oklahoma City. Placed 2B Chase Utley on the 10-day disabled list with a left thumb sprain and recalled Switch-Pitcher Pat Venditte from AAA Oklahoma City.

On May 31, activated LHP Clayton Kershaw from the 10-day disabled list and optioned Switch-Pitcher Pat Venditte to AAA Oklahoma City.

June
On June 1, placed LHP Clayton Kershaw on the 10-day disabled list with lower back strain and recalled RHP Brock Stewart from AAA Oklahoma City.
On June 2, claimed LHP P. J. Conlon off waivers from the New York Mets, optioned him to AAA Oklahoma City, and transferred LHP Hyun-jin Ryu from the 10-day disabled list to the 60-day disabled list.
On June 6, optioned RHP Pedro Báez to AAA Oklahoma City, purchased the contract of LHP Caleb Ferguson from AAA Oklahoma City and LHP P. J. Conlon was claimed off waivers by the New York Mets.
On June 7, placed LHP Tony Cingrani on the 10-day disabled list with a left shoulder strain, optioned LHP Caleb Ferguson to AAA Oklahoma City and recalled RHP Pedro Báez and LHP Edward Paredes from AAA Oklahoma City.
On June 8, placed RHP Dennis Santana on the 10-day disabled list with a right rotator cuff strain, optioned RHP Brock Stewart to AAA Oklahoma City and recalled LHP Adam Liberatore and Switch-Pitcher Pat Venditte from AAA Oklahoma City.

On June 9, optioned Switch-Pitcher Pat Venditte to AAA Oklahoma City, transferred RHP Dennis Santana from the 10-day disabled list to the 60-day disabled list and purchased the contract of RHP Daniel Corcino from AAA Oklahoma City.
On June 12, placed RHP Walker Buehler on the 10-day disabled list with a rib microfracture and recalled RHP Caleb Ferguson from AAA Oklahoma City.
On June 13, activated RHP Kenta Maeda from the 10-day disabled list and optioned RHP Daniel Corcino to AAA Oklahoma City.
On June 15, placed RHP Pedro Báez on the 10-day disabled list with right biceps tendonitis and recalled C/IF Kyle Farmer from AAA Oklahoma City.
On June 19, activated LHP Rich Hill from the 10-day disabled list, recalled RHP Brock Stewart from AAA Oklahoma City and optioned IF Breyvic Valera to AAA Oklahoma City.
On June 20, optioned RHP Brock Stewart and C/IF Kyle Farmer to AAA Oklahoma City.
On June 22, activated IF Chase Utley from the 10-day disabled list.
On June 23, activated LHP Clayton Kershaw from the 10-day disabled list and optioned LHP Adam Liberatore to AAA Oklahoma City.
On June 28, activated RHP Walker Buehler from the 10-day disabled list and placed RHP Josh Fields on the 10-day disabled list with right shoulder inflammation.
On June 29, optioned RHP Walker Buehler to Advanced Class-A Rancho Cucamonga.

On June 30, recalled RHP J. T. Chargois from AAA Oklahoma City.

July
On July 4, acquired RHP Dylan Floro, minor league RHP Zach Neal and international bonus pool space from the Cincinnati Reds in exchange for minor league pitchers James Marinan and  Aneurys Zabala. Designated RHP Daniel Corcino for assignment.
On July 7, activated RHP Dylan Floro, recalled Switch-Pitcher Pat Venditte from AAA Oklahoma City, placed RHP Yimi García on the 10-day disabled list with right forearm inflammation and placed RHP Kenta Maeda on the paternity list.
On July 9, placed OF Yasiel Puig on the 10-day disabled list with a right oblique strain and recalled OF Andrew Toles from AAA Oklahoma City.

On July 10, activated RHP Kenta Maeda from the paternity list and optioned LHP Edward Paredes to AAA Oklahoma City.
On July 11, claimed LHP Zac Rosscup off waivers from the Colorado Rockies and designated LHP Edward Paredes for assignment.
On July 13, activated RHP Walker Buehler from the 10-day disabled list and optioned Switch-Pitcher Pat Venditte to AAA Oklahoma City.
On July 14, activated LHP Zac Rosscup and optioned RHP Walker Buehler to AAA Oklahoma City.
On July 18, acquired SS/3B Manny Machado from the Baltimore Orioles in exchange for IF Breyvic Valera and minor league players Dean Kremer, Yusniel Diaz, Zach Pop and Rylan Bannon.
On July 20, activated SS/3B Manny Machado and optioned OF Andrew Toles to AAA Oklahoma City.
On July 23, placed 3B Justin Turner on the 10-day disabled list with a right groin strain and recalled OF Alex Verdugo from AAA Oklahoma City.
On July 25, placed LHP Zac Rosscup on the 10-day disabled list with middle finger inflammation, activated RHP Pedro Báez from the 10-day disabled list, recalled RHP Walker Buehler from AAA Oklahoma City and optioned RHP Dylan Floro to AAA Oklahoma City.
On July 28, activated OF Yasiel Puig from the 10-day disabled list and optioned OF Alex Verdugo to AAA Oklahoma City.

On July 30, placed RHP Ross Stripling on the 10-day disabled list with right toe inflammation and recalled RHP Dylan Floro from AAA Oklahoma City.

On July 31, acquired 2B Brian Dozier from the Minnesota Twins in exchange for 2B Logan Forsythe and minor leaguers Devin Smeltzer and Luke Raley. Acquired RHP John Axford from the Toronto Blue Jays in exchange for minor leaguer Corey Copping. Designated RHP Ariel Hernández for assignment.

August
On August 2, activated 3B Justin Turner from the 10-day disabled list and placed IF Chase Utley on the 10-day disabled list with left wrist inflammation.

On August 3, activated RHP John Axford and placed RHP Erik Goeddel on the 10-day disabled list with right lat inflammation.

On August 7, placed RHP Daniel Hudson on the 10-day disabled list with right forearm tightness and recalled switch-pitcher Pat Venditte from AAA Oklahoma City.
On August 9, activated RHP Ross Stripling from the 10-day disabled list and optioned switch-pitcher Pat Venditte to AAA Oklahoma City.

On August 10, placed RHP Kenley Jansen on the 10-day disabled with an irregular heartbeat and recalled switch-pitcher Pat Venditte from AAA Oklahoma City.

On August 13, activated RHP Erik Goeddel from the 10-day disabled list and optioned switch-pitcher Pat Venditte to AAA Oklahoma City.

On August 14, activated LHP Alex Wood from the 10-day disabled list and placed RHP John Axford on the 10-day disabled list with a fractured right fibula.
On August 15, activated LHP Hyun-jin Ryu from the 60-day disabled list, transferred LHP Tony Cingrani from the 10-day disabled list to the 60-day disabled list and placed RHP Ross Stripling on the 10-day disabled list with lower back inflammation.

On August 17, activated RHP Daniel Hudson from the 10-day disabled list and placed RHP Erik Goeddel on the 10-day disabled list with  right elbow inflammation.

On August 20, activated RHP Kenley Jansen from the 10-day disabled list and placed LHP Zac Rosscup on the 10-day disabled list with a left calf strain.
On August 21, placed RHP J. T. Chargois on the 10-day disabled list with a neck injury and recalled switch-pitcher Pat Venditte from AAA Oklahoma City.

On August 24, placed RHP Daniel Hudson on the 10-day disabled list with right forearm tightness and activated RHP Yimi García from the 10-day disabled list.
On August 25, transferred RHP Josh Fields from the 10-day disabled list to the 60-day disabled list and activated LHP Julio Urías from the 60-day disabled list and optioned him to Class-A Advanced Rancho Cucamonga.
On August 30, activated RHP Josh Fields from the 60-day disabled list, optioned RHP Yimi García to Advanced Class-A Rancho Cucamonga and designated IF/OF Rob Segedin for assignment.
On August 31, acquired RHP Ryan Madson from the Washington Nationals in exchange for minor league pitcher Andrew Istler and 3B/1B David Freese from the Pittsburgh Pirates in exchange for minor league infielder Jesus Manuel Valdez. Designated LHP Adam Liberatore for assignment and transferred RHP Erik Goeddel from the 10-day disabled list to the 60-day disabled list.

September
On September 1, activated RHP Ryan Madson and 3B/1B David Freese, activated IF Chase Utley and LHP Zac Rosscup from the 10-day disabled list and recalled C/3B Kyle Farmer, IF/OF Tim Locastro and OFs Alex Verdugo and Andrew Toles from AAA Oklahoma City.
On September 2, recalled RHP Brock Stewart from AAA Oklahoma City and placed him on the 60-day disabled list with a right oblique strain. Purchased the contract of C Rocky Gale from AAA Oklahoma City.
On September 7, activated RHP Ross Stripling from the 10-day disabled list.
On September 10, recalled LHP Julio Urías from AAA Oklahoma City.
On September 17, activated RHP John Axford from the 10-day disabled list, activated LHP Tony Cingrani from the 60-day disabled list, recalled RHP Yimi García from Advanced Class-A Rancho Cucamonga and transferred RHP Daniel Hudson from the 10-day disabled list to the 60-day disabled list.
On September 24, activated RHP J. T. Chargois from the 10-day disabled list.

Farm system

Mid-Season All-Stars
 All-Star Futures Game
Catcher Keibert Ruiz
Outfielder Yusniel Díaz

 Pacific Coast League All-Stars
Pitcher Manny Banuelos
Pitcher Pat Venditte
Catcher Rocky Gale
Outfielder Alex Verdugo

 Texas League All-Stars
Pitcher Yadier Álvarez
Pitcher Justin De Fratus
Catcher Keibert Ruiz
Infielder Drew Jackson
Infielder Connor Joe

 California League All-Stars
Pitcher Dean Kremer
Pitcher Tony Gonsolin
Catcher Connor Wong
Shortstop Gavin Lux
Third baseman Rylan Bannon
Outfielder Logan Landon

 Midwest League All-Stars
Pitcher Andre Scrubb
Infielder Jared Walker

Pioneer League All-Stars
Pitcher Jose Chacin
Shortstop Ronny Brito
Shortstop Jacob Amaya
Outfielder Daniel Robinson

Dominican Summer League All-Stars
Pitcher Carlos Duran
Pitcher Carlos Montilla
Pitcher Jose Rodulfo
Outfielder Andy Pages

Post-Season All-Stars
Pacific Coast League All-Stars
Pitcher Manny Banuelos
Outfielder Alex Verdugo

Texas League All-Stars
Outfielder Jacob Scavuzzo

California League All-Stars
Pitcher Dustin May
Shortstop Gavin Lux
Infielder Rylan Bannon (also Rookie of the Year and Most Valuable Player)
Outfielder Cody Thomas

Pioneer League All-Stars
Pitcher Jose Chacin
Shortstop Ronny Brito

Baseball America High Class A All-Stars
Shortstop Gavin Lux (Player of the Year)

Arizona Fall League Fall Stars Game
Pitcher Jordan Sheffield
Catcher Keibert Ruiz

Notes

The Dodgers named Gavin Lux and Tony Gonsolin as the organizations Minor League Player and Pitcher of the Year.
The Oklahoma City Dodgers won two straight double headers from the Colorado Springs Sky Sox on the last two days of the regular season to move past them to win the Pacific Coast League American North Division Title and a spot in the playoffs. However, they lost their opening playoff series, three games to one, to the Memphis Redbirds.
On August 31, the Tulsa Drillers clinched a playoff berth and a spot in the Texas League playoffs with an 8–1 win over the Northwest Arkansas Naturals. They then beat the Arkansas Travelers in five games in the North Division Championship Series. The Drillers  won the Texas League championship with a three-game series sweep of the San Antonio Missions.
On June 17, the Rancho Cucamonga Quakes clinched a first half division title and a spot in the California League playoffs with a 10–4 win over the Inland Empire 66ers. The Quakes defeated the Lancaster JetHawks, three games to one, in the semi-finals and advanced to the California League championship series. The Quakes won the championship with a three-game series sweep of the Visalia Rawhide.
On August 30, the Great Lakes Loons clinched a spot in the Midwest League playoffs. However, they were swept in their first round playoff series by the West Michigan Whitecaps.
On July 19, the Ogden Raptors clinched the first-half Pioneer League South Division championship and a playoff spot. They were eliminated in three games in the first round of the playoffs by the Grand Junction Rockies.
The Arizona League Dodgers won the league championship over the Arizona League Cubs 1 two games to one.

Major League Baseball draft

 
The Dodgers selected 40 players in this draft. In the first round, they selected pitcher J. T. Ginn from Brandon High School in Brandon, Mississippi. Ginn did not  sign and chose to attend college instead. As of the 2022 season, two players from this draft have played in the majors.

References

External links
Los Angeles Dodgers Official Site 
2018 Los Angeles Dodgers season at  Baseball Reference

Los Angeles Dodgers
Los Angeles Dodgers
Los Angeles Dodgers seasons
National League West champion seasons
National League champion seasons
Dodgers